The 2000 Barrow-in-Furness Borough Council election took place on 4 May 2000 to elect members of Barrow-in-Furness Borough Council in Cumbria, England. One third of the council was up for election and the council stayed under no overall control.

After the election, the composition of the council was:
Labour 18
Conservative 16
People's Party 4

Results

Ward results

References

2000 English local elections
2000
2000s in Cumbria